Jean-Michel Charlier (30 October 1924 – 10 July 1989) was a Belgian comics writer. He was a co-founder of the famed Franco-Belgian comics magazine Pilote.

Life 
Charlier was born in Liège, Belgium, in 1924. In 1945 he got a job as a draughtsman in Brussels with World Press, the syndicate of Georges Troisfontaines, which worked mainly for Spirou magazine. The following year he and artist Victor Hubinon created the four-page comic strip L'Agonie du Bismarck. Charlier wrote the script and also drew the ships and airplanes. In 1947, Charlier and Hubinon began the long-running air-adventure comic strip Buck Danny. After a few years, Charlier stopped all work on the drawings and concentrated only on the scenarios, on the advice of Jijé, then the senior artist at Spirou.

Unable to support himself writing comic scripts at a time when Dupuis concentrated almost solely on the magazine and albums were few and far between, Charlier qualified for a pilots license in 1949 and briefly flew for the airline SABENA.

However the following year Charlier returned to comic strips, collaborating with Hubinon once again to create Tiger Joe for La Libre Junior, the weekly comics supplement to the journal La Libre Belgique. Charlier also continued to supply scripts for Spirou magazine, collaborating with Eddy Paape on the strip Valhardi and, in 1955, with future Asterix artist Albert Uderzo on the comic strip Belloy. Together with Hubinon, he also created some biographical comics like Jean Mermoz and Surcouf. Other long-running series he started for Spirou in the early 1950s were La Patrouille des Castors for Mitacq, and in 1951 Les Vraies Histoires de l'Oncle Paul (Uncle Paul's true stories), a weekly comic of four pages telling a true story. The latter series was continued from 1954 on by Octave Joly, and was a place where many young talents published their first comics, including Jean Graton, René Follet and Hermann Huppen.

Charlier, Hubinon, Uderzo, and comic-strip writer René Goscinny founded the comics agency Edifrance and the magazine Pistolin in 1955, and the influential magazine Pilote in 1959. Charlier was editor-in-chief and also wrote two stories for the first issue: Redbeard with Hubinon and Tanguy and Laverdure with Uderzo – these latter two characters would later get their own TV series as well: Les Chevaliers du Ciel, featuring Tanguy and Laverdure, was made by ORTF between 1967 and 1969, an English-dubbed version of the show being released under the title The Aeronauts.

Of seminal importance for the cultural phenomenon bandes dessinée turned out to be Charlier's initiative as publishing co-editor to start a line of comic book books for Dargaud (which bought out Pilote in 1960), collecting the stories as serialized in Pilote, becoming in effect Dargaud's first comic book releases. The first title in the series, coined La Collection Pilote, was the first adventure of Asterix from Uderzo and Goscinny, a runaway success right from the bat, followed by 16 comic titles from the magazine, with the first Blueberry adventure, Fort Navajo, becoming the last to be released in 1965. After that, the collection was suspended and each comic hero hitherto featured therein, spun off in book series of their own. In order to give these releases a more "mature" image, the books were from the very start executed as hard cover editions for France, though they were, somewhat ironically, executed in soft cover for Charlier's own native Belgium. More than favorably received however, the collection has attained a mythical status in the world of Franco-Belgian comics.

Charlier visited the United States in 1963 and a tour of the American West inspired him to create Fort Navajo, a western series, for Pilote. He chose as artist Jean Giraud (Moebius), then a commercial illustrator who had briefly worked with Jijé on Jerry Spring, a popular European western strip.  Fort Navajo, later renamed Blueberry or Lieutenant Blueberry after its main character, became a popular and innovative graphic novel. In 1972 friction among the staff at Pilote caused Charlier to give up his editorial position and he worked in French television until 1976. He then worked as editor-in-chief for two years at Tintin magazine.  He continued to write Blueberry and Buck Danny stories.

Jean-Michel Charlier died in Saint-Cloud, France, in 1989. His main series are all continued by other writers, often chosen by Charlier himself.

Awards
1973: Shazam Award of the Academy of Comic Book Arts for Lieutenant Blueberry in the category "Best Foreign Comic Series", shared with Jean Giraud.
1973: Prix Phénix, Paris, in the category "Scenario d'Aventures", Charlier only.

Bibliography

References

 Jean-Michel Charlier publications in Spirou and Pilote, BDoubliées.com 
 STROUMPF: Les Cahiers de la BD, nº 37, 1978 
 
 
 
 ; the vast majority of the featured artist's interviews, conducted by Svane, was originally published in French in the Swiss comic journal Swof, Hors-Séries (Moebius-themed) issue 2, 2000/Q1, but were augmented with material edited out in the original publication, as well as augmented with material from other, older source publications, especially opportune in the latter case for the by then deceased Jean-Michel Charlier.
 ; biography

Footnotes

External links
 Jean-Michel Charlier official site  
 On Dupuis.com
 Jean-Michel Charlier biography on Lambiek Comiclopedia

1924 births
1989 deaths
Writers from Liège
Belgian comics writers
Belgian editors
Belgian magazine editors
Buck Danny